Wood Township is a township in Huntingdon County, Pennsylvania, United States. The population was 617 at the 2020 census.

History
The Robertsdale Historic District was listed on the National Register of Historic Places in 1992.

Geography
According to the United States Census Bureau, the township has a total area of 16.4 square miles (42.6 km2), all  land.

Demographics

As of the census of 2000, there were 713 people, 277 households, and 206 families residing in the township. The population density was 43.4 people per square mile (16.8/km2). There were 383 housing units at an average density of 23.3/sq mi (9.0/km2). The racial makeup of the township was 99.30% White, 0.14% Native American, 0.28% from other races, and 0.28% from two or more races. Hispanic or Latino of any race were 0.70% of the population.

There were 277 households, out of which 34.3% had children under the age of 18 living with them, 61.0% were married couples living together, 7.6% had a female householder with no husband present, and 25.3% were non-families. 23.1% of all households were made up of individuals, and 10.1% had someone living alone who was 65 years of age or older. The average household size was 2.57 and the average family size was 2.99.

In the township the population was spread out, with 25.2% under the age of 18, 10.1% from 18 to 24, 24.7% from 25 to 44, 24.7% from 45 to 64, and 15.3% who were 65 years of age or older. The median age was 38 years. For every 100 females there were 100.8 males. For every 100 females age 18 and over, there were 98.1 males.

The median income for a household in the township was $29,167, and the median income for a family was $38,438. Males had a median income of $28,654 versus $20,375 for females. The per capita income for the township was $13,512. About 9.2% of families and 14.6% of the population were below the poverty line, including 16.3% of those under age 18 and 16.0% of those age 65 or over.

References

Townships in Huntingdon County, Pennsylvania
Townships in Pennsylvania